Zirconyl chloride is the inorganic compound with the formula of [Zr4(OH)8(H2O)16]Cl8(H2O)12, more commonly written ZrOCl2·8H2O, and referred to as zirconyl chloride octahydrate. It is a white solid and is the most common water-soluble derivative of zirconium.  A compound with the formula ZrOCl2 has not been characterized.

Production and structure

The salt is produced by hydrolysis of zirconium tetrachloride or treating zirconium oxide with hydrochloric acid. It adopts a tetrameric structure, consisting of the cation [Zr4(OH)8]8+.   features four pairs of hydroxide bridging ligands linking four Zr4+ centers.  The chloride anions are not ligands, consistent with the high oxophilicity of Zr(IV).  The salt crystallizes as tetragonal crystals.

See also
 Zirconyl acetate

References

External links
MSDS Data
MSDS data Sigma-Aldrich

Zirconium(IV) compounds
Chlorides
Metal halides
Oxychlorides